Aedes (Downsiomyia) niveus is a species complex of zoophilic mosquito belonging to the genus Aedes. It is found in Sri Lanka, India, Vietnam and other South East Asian countries. It is a vector of filariasis.

References

External links
Aedes niveus group of China (Diptera: Culicidae) 1981
Aedes (Fin.) niveus - Walter Reed Biosystematics Unit
Downsiomyia Vargas, 1950 - Mosquito Taxonomic Inventory
Habitat suitability of the mosquito: Aedes niveus Complex

niveus
Insects described in 1903